KCLS (101.5 FM) is a radio station licensed to Leeds, Utah. The station is owned by Canyon Media Group, LLC. The station airs a soft adult contemporary format.

The station was assigned the KCLS call letters by the Federal Communications Commission on July 13, 1998.

KCLS-HD2 airs an active rock format branded as "96X", which is also heard on 96.3 FM, through a translator in St. George, Utah. KCLS-HD3 airs a Spanish adult hits format branded as "Juan 106 FM", which is also heard on 106.5 FM and 106.9 FM, through translators in St. George.

On March 25, 2019, Easy 101.5 rebranded as Sunny 101.5.

Translators

Previous logos

References

External links

KCLS Launch Party

CLS (FM)
Soft adult contemporary radio stations in the United States
Radio stations established in 1998